In the mathematical field of graph theory, the Balaban 11-cage or Balaban (3,11)-cage is a 3-regular graph with 112 vertices and 168 edges named after Alexandru T. Balaban.

The Balaban 11-cage is the unique (3,11)-cage. It was discovered by Balaban in 1973. The uniqueness was proved by Brendan McKay and Wendy Myrvold in 2003.

The Balaban 11-cage is a Hamiltonian graph and can be constructed by excision from the Tutte 12-cage by removing a small subtree and suppressing the resulting vertices of degree two.

It has independence number 52, chromatic number 3, chromatic index 3, radius 6, diameter 8 and girth 11. It is also a 3-vertex-connected graph and a 3-edge-connected graph.

The characteristic polynomial of the Balaban 11-cage is:
 
 
.

The automorphism group of the Balaban 11-cage is of order 64.

Gallery

References

References

Individual graphs
Regular graphs